This list of performing arts awards is an index to articles that describe notable awards related to the performing arts. The list includes awards for the performing arts in general, for supporting roles such as lighting and make-up, and for specialized genres such as magic and puppetry. The list excludes awards for acting, dance, music and theatre which are covered by separate lists.

General

See also

 Lists of awards
 Lists of acting awards
 List of dance awards
 List of music awards
 List of theatre awards
 Lists of humanities awards

References